
Trust is a 2022 novel written by Hernan Diaz. The novel was published by Riverhead Books.

Writing and development
Diaz's initial inspiration for the novel was a desire to "write about extreme wealth and capital". Diaz sees a "certain continuity" between Trust and his first novel, In the Distance.

Reception

Critical reception
According to literary review aggregator Book Marks, the novel received mostly "Rave" reviews.

Honors and accolades
The novel won the 2022 Kirkus Prize for Fiction. The novel was longlisted for the 2022 Booker Prize. Trust was named one of the "10 Best Books of 2022" by The Washington Post and The New York Times.

The New Yorker and Esquire included the novel on their lists of the best books of 2022. The novel was also included on a year-end list of books published in 2022 which were "loved" by NPR staff.

Adaptation
Kate Winslet will star in and produce a limited television series adaptation of Trust. Todd Haynes is reportedly set to direct the series making it his second collaboration with Winslet and HBO after Mildred Pierce.

References

External links
 
  (See Jean Strouse.)
 
  (mini-review of Trust from 4:40 to 5:30 of 8:00 in video)

Fiction books
2022 books
Riverhead Books books
Novels set in New York City